Lo Ovalle is an underground metro station on Line 2 of the Santiago Metro, in Santiago, Chile. The station was opened on 21 December 1978 as the southern terminus of the extension of the line from Franklin. On 22 December 2004 the line was extended further south to La Cisterna.

The station was the southern terminus for a quarter-century prior to inaugurating the Line 2 expansion to La Cisterna. Nevertheless, it still remains a key transit hub for many South and Western Santiago commuters.

References

Santiago Metro stations
Railway stations opened in 1978
Santiago Metro Line 2